Shek Po Tsuen is a walled village in Hung Shui Kiu, Yuen Long District, Hong Kong.

Administration
Shek Po Tsuen is a recognized village under the New Territories Small House Policy. It is one of the 37 villages represented within the Ping Shan Rural Committee. For electoral purposes, Shek Po Tsuen is part of the Ping Shan Central constituency.

History
Shek Po Tsuen was established in 1531, during the Ming dynasty.

Shek Po Tsuen appears on the "Map of the San-On District", published in 1866 by Simeone Volonteri.

At the time of the 1911 census, the population of Shek Po was 257. The number of males was 108.

Features
The entrance gate of Shek Po Wai in Shek Po Tsuen is a Grade III historic building.

See also
 Walled villages of Hong Kong

References

External links

 Delineation of area of existing village Shek Po Tsuen (Ping Shan) for election of resident representative (2019 to 2022)
 Antiquities Advisory Board. Pictures of the Entrance Gate of Shek Po Wai

Walled villages of Hong Kong
Ping Shan
Villages in Yuen Long District, Hong Kong